Cuba will participate in the 2011 Parapan American Games.

Medalists

Athletics

Cuba will send seventeen male and five female athletes to compete.

Cycling

Cuba will send two male athletes to compete. One male athlete will compete in the road cycling tournament, while one male athlete will compete in the track cycling tournament.

Judo

Cuba will send seven male and three female athletes to compete.

Powerlifting

Cuba will send six male athletes to compete.

Swimming

Cuba will send four male swimmers to compete.

Table tennis

Cuba will send four male and one female table tennis player to compete.

Nations at the 2011 Parapan American Games
2011 in Cuban sport
Cuba at the Pan American Games